Serbophilia (literally love for Serbia and Serbs) is the admiration, appreciation or emulation of  non-Serbian person who expresses a strong interest, positive predisposition or appreciation for the Serbian people, Serbia, Republika Srpska, Serbian language, culture or history.  Its opposite is Serbophobia.

History

20th century

World War I
During World War I, Serbophilia was present in western countries.

Breakup of Yugoslavia
Political scientist Sabrina P. Ramet writes that Serbophilia in France during the 1990s was "traditional", partly as a response to the closeness between Germany and Croatia. Business ties continued during the war and fostered a desire for economic normalization.

Serbophiles
 Jacob Grimm  German philologist, jurist and mythologist. Learnt Serbian in order to read Serbian epic poetry.
 Archibald Reiss   German-Swiss publicist, chemist, forensic scientist, a professor at the University of Lausanne.
 Victor Hugo  French poet, novelist, and dramatist of the Romantic movement. Hugo wrote the speech Pour la Serbie.
 Alphonse de Lamartine  French author, poet, and statesman.
 Helen of Anjou  French noblewoman who became queen consort of the Serbian Kingdom.
 Mircea I and Vlad III Dracula
Several notable composers used motifs from Serbian folk music and composed works inspired by Serbian history or culture, such as:
 Johannes Brahms German composer, pianist, and conductor of the Romantic period.
Franz Liszt  Hungarian composer, virtuoso pianist, conductor, music teacher, arranger, and organist of the Romantic era.
Arthur Rubinstein  Polish-American classical pianist.
 Antonín Dvořák  Czech composer, one of the first to achieve worldwide recognition.
 Pyotr Ilyich Tchaikovsky  Russian composer of the Romantic period (See Serbo-Russian March).
 Nikolai Rimsky-Korsakov  Russian composer, and a member of the group of composers known as The Five (See Fantasy on Serbian Themes).
 Franz Schubert  Austrian composer of the late Classical and early Romantic eras.
 Hans Huber  Swiss composer. Between 1894 and 1918, he composed five operas.
 Rebecca West (1892–1983)  British travel writer. Was described by American media as having a pro-Serbian stance.
 Flora Sandes  British Irish volunteer in World War I.
 Ruth Mitchell  American volunteer in the Chetniks, World War II. Sister of Billy Mitchell.
Robert De Niro American actor
John Challis English actor best known for portraying Terrance Aubrey "Boycie" Boyce in the BBC Television sitcom Only Fools and Horses (1981–2003) and its sequel/spin-off The Green Green Grass (2005–2009) 
 Peter Handke  Austrian novelist and playwright, Nobel Prize winner. Supported Serbia in the Yugoslav Wars.
 Eduard Limonov  Russian writer and poet.
 Ángel Pulido  Spanish physician, publicist and politician, who stood out as prominent philosephardite during the Restoration 
 Essad Pasha Toptani  Ottoman Albanian politician.
 Anna Dandolo Venetian noblewoman who became Queen of Serbia.
 Józef Bartłomiej Zimorowic  Polish poet and historian of the Baroque era.
 Adam Jerzy Czartoryski  Polish nobleman, statesman, diplomat and author.
 Pavel Jozef Šafárik  Slovakian philologist, poet, literary historian, historian and ethnographer in the Kingdom of Hungary. He was one of the first scientific Slavistics.
 Ján Kollár  Slovakian writer (mainly poet), archaeologist, scientist, politician, and main ideologist of Pan-Slavism.
 Ľudovít Štúr  Slovakian revolutionary politician and writer.
 Henry Bax-Ironside  British diplomat.
 Eleftherios Venizelos  Greek statesman and a prominent leader of the Greek national liberation movement.
 Dimitrios Karatasos  Greek armatolos who participated in the Greek War of Independence, and several other rebellions, seeking to liberate his native Greek Macedonia.
 Herbert Vivian  British journalist and author of Servia: The Poor Man's Paradise and  The Servian Tragedy: With Some Impressions of Macedonia.
 Alexander Kolchak  Imperial Russian admiral, military leader and polar explorer.
 Yu Hua  Chinese author.
 František Zach  Czech soldier and military theorist.

Gallery

See also
Serbian nationalism
Slavophilia
Greece–Serbia relations

References

Sources
Sells, David (1997). Serb 'Demons' Strike Back (Royal Institute of International Affairs) Vol. 53, No. 2

External links

Admiration of foreign cultures
Serbian culture
Serbian nationalism